Charles Michael Jarrell (May 15, 1940) is an American prelate of the Roman Catholic Church, serving as bishop of the Diocese of Lafayette in Louisiana from 2002 to 2016. Jarrell served as bishop of the Diocese of Houma–Thibodaux in Louisiana from 1993 to 2002.

Biography

Early life 
Bishop Michael Jarrell was born on May 15, 1940, in Opelousas, Louisiana to William Jarrell Sr. and Jessie Rosa Barnett Jarrell.  He attended public schools in Opelousas, then entered the Immaculata Minor Seminary in Lafayette, Louisiana.  In 1960, Jarrell entered Catholic University of America in Washington, D.C., earning a Bachelor of Philosophy degree in 1962 and an Master of Philosophy degree in 1963. Jarrell was ordained to the subdiaconate and then the diaconate in June 1966 by then Auxiliary Bishop Warren L. Boudreaux.

Priesthood 
On June 3, 1967, Jarrell was ordained a priest by Bishop Maurice Schexnayder at the Cathedral of Saint John the Evangelist in Lafayette.

After his ordination, Jarrell became a teacher at  Landry High School in Lake Charles, Louisiana.  In 1972, he was assigned as associate pastor to St. Michael Parish in Crowley, Louisiana. Jerrell was named pastor in 1976 of Sacred Heart Parish in Broussard, Louisiana, then in 1984 was moved to Sacred Heart Parish in Ville Platte, Louisiana.  Jarrell remained in Ville Platte until 1993. Jarrell also served as regional vicar of three deaneries, as diocesan consultor and as chairman of the Clergy Continuing Education Committee.  In 1988, Pope John Paul II named Jarrell a prelate of honor.

Bishop of Houma-Thibodaux 
On March 4, 1993, Pope John Paul II appointed Jarrell as bishop of the Diocese Diocese of Houma–Thibodaux.  He was consecrated on March 4, 1993, by Archbishop Francis Schulte.

Bishop of Lafayette 
On November 8, 2002, John Paul II appointed Jarrell as bishop for the Diocese of Lafayette. He was installed on December 18, 2002 at the Cathedral of Saint John the Evangelist. In 2015, it was revealed that ten years previously, the Diocese of Lafayette had paid a $26 million settlement to the families of 123 children who were sexually abused by diocese priests between 1959 and 2002.  The Daily Advertiser urged the release of the priests' names, but Jarrell refused, saying that he could not see the point.

Retirement 
On February 18, 2016, Pope Francis accepted Jarrell's letter of resignation as bishop of the Diocese of Lafayette and appointed then Auxiliary Bishop J. Douglas Deshotel to succeed him.

References

External links
Roman Catholic Diocese of Lafayette in Louisiana Official Site

20th-century Roman Catholic bishops in the United States
Catholic University of America alumni
1940 births
Living people
People from Opelousas, Louisiana
21st-century Roman Catholic bishops in the United States